Bikas Kanta Chakrabarti (born 14 December 1952 in Kolkata (erstwhile Calcutta) is an Indian physicist.  Since January 2018, he is emeritus professor of physics at the Saha Institute of Nuclear Physics, Kolkata, India.

Biography

Chakrabarti received his Ph.D. degree from Calcutta University in 1979. Following post-doctoral work at the University of Oxford and the University of Cologne, he joined the faculty of Saha Institute of Nuclear Physics (SINP) in 1983. He is S. S. Bhatnagar Prize awardee (1997) and  J. C. Bose National Fellow (2011-2020). He is a former director of SINP.  At present he is INSA Senior Scientist and Emeritus Professor at SINP,  and also Honorary  Visiting Professor of economics at the Indian Statistical Institute. He was Honorary Emeritus Professor (2018-2021) at S.N. Bose National Centre for Basic Sciences. Much of Chakrabarti's research has centered around statistical physics & condensed matter physics (including Quantum computing & Quantum annealing; see also D-Wave Systems & Timeline of quantum computing) and their application to social sciences (see e.g., Econophysics).  He has authored several books and papers in the fields of physics and economics. Chakrabarti is (and was) member of the editorial boards of a number of physics and economics journals and book series.

Honors, Awards & Recognitions

Awards, Fellowships, etc
 Young Scientist Award of Indian National Science Academy, New Delhi (1984)
 Shanti Swarup Bhatnagar Award of the Council of Scientific and Industrial Research, India (1997)
 Fellow, Indian Academy of Sciences, Bangalore (1997)
 Fellow, Indian National Science Academy, New Delhi (2003)
 Honorary Visiting Professor, Indian Statistical Institute, Kolkata (2007- )
 Outstanding Referee Award of the American Physical Society (2010)
 J. C. Bose National Fellow, Department of Science and Technology (India) (2011-2020)
 Honorary Emeritus Professor, S. N. Bose National Centre for Basic Sciences (2018-2021)
 INSA Senior Scientist, Indian National Science Academy (2021- )

Peer Recognition/Appreciation

 "Father of Econophysics", Thesis, Dept. History and Philosophy of Science, University of Cambridge (2018)
 "Earliest Work in Laying Foundation of Quantum annealing", Publication from Inst. Theor. Phys., University of Innsbruck (2022)

Publications

Books

 Quantum Ising Phases and Transitions in Transverse Ising Models, Bikas K. Chakrabarti, Amit Dutta and Parangama Sen, Springer-Verlag, Heidelberg (1996).
 Statistical Physics of Fracture and Breakdown in Disordered Solids, Bikas K. Chakrabarti and L. Gilles Benguigui, Oxford University Press, Oxford (1997).
 Econophysics: An Introduction, Sitabhra Sinha, Arnab Chatterjee, Anirban Chakraborti and Bikas K. Chakrabarti, Wiley-VCH, Berlin (2011)
 Econophysics of Income & Wealth Distributions,  Bikas K. Chakrabarti, Anirban Chakraborti, Satya R. Chakravarty and  Arnab Chatterjee, Cambridge University Press, Cambridge (2013).
 Quantum Ising Phases and Transitions in Transverse Ising Models, Sei Suzuki, Jun-ichi Inoue and Bikas K. Chakrabarti, Springer-Verlag, Heidelberg (2013).
 Sociophysics: An Introduction, Parangama Sen and Bikas K. Chakrabarti, Oxford University Press, Oxford (2014).
 Quantum Phase Transitions in Transverse Field Spin Models: From Statistical Physics to Quantum Information, Amit Dutta, Gabriel Aeppli, Bikas K. Chakrabarti, Uma Divakaran, Thomas Felix Rosenbaum & Diptiman Sen, Cambridge University Press, Cambridge (2015).
 Statistical Physics of Fracture, Breakdown & Earthquakes, Soumyajyoti Biswas, Purusattam Ray & Bikas K. Chakrabarti, Wiley-VCH, Berlin (2015).
  Quantum Spin Glasses, Annealing and Computation, Shu Tanaka, Ryo Tamura & Bikas K. Chakrabarti, Cambridge University Press, Cambridge (2017).
 Econophysics of the Kolkata Restaurant Problem and Related Games: Classical and Quantum Strategies for Multi-agent, Multi-choice Repetitive Games, Bikas K Chakrabarti, Arnab Chatterjee, Asim Ghosh, Sudip Mukherjee & Boaz Tamir, Springer International Publishing, Switzerland (2017)

Reviews
 B. K. Chakrabarti and M. Acharyya, Dynamic Transitions and Hysteresis, Rev. Mod. Phys. 71, 847 (1999)
 A. Das and B. K. Chakrabarti, Quantum Annealing and Analog Quantum Computations, Rev. Mod. Phys. 80, 1061 (2008)
 S. Pradhan, A. Hansen, and B. K. Chakrabarti, Failure Processes in Elastic Fiber Bundles, Rev. Mod. Phys. 82, 499 (2010).
 H. Kawamura, T. Hatano, N. Kato, S. Biswas, and B. K. Chakrabarti, Statistical Physics of Fracture, Friction, and Earthquakes, Rev. Mod. Phys. 84, 839 (2012).
 A. Chakraborti, D. Challet, A. Chatterjee, M. Marsili, Y.-C. Zhang, and B. K. Chakrabarti, Statistical Mechanics of Competitive Resource Allocation using Agent-Based Models, Phys. Rep. 552, 1 (2015).

References

External links
 Google Sites Homepage 
 Profile in Vidwan Database 
 Outstanding Referees of the American Physical Society
 Fathers of Econophysics: Cambridge University Thesis (Open Access, see pp. 15-16)
 Earliest Work in Laying Foundation of Quantum Annealing (Open Access, see Introduction)

Living people
1952 births
Recipients of the Shanti Swarup Bhatnagar Award in Physical Science
University of Calcutta alumni
Scientists from Kolkata
Indian condensed matter physicists
Quantum information scientists